Progressive Youth Organisation may refer to:

 Progressive Youth Organization (PY), a Maoist organization in Afghanistan (1965-1972)
 Progressive Youth Organisation, a Lebanese member of the International Union of Socialist Youth
 Progressive Youth Organisation of Guyana, a wing of the Guyanese People's Progressive Party (PPP)